An electoral redistribution was undertaken in 2008 in British Columbia in a process that began in late 2005 and was completed with the passage of the Electoral Districts Act, 2008 on April 10, 2008. The redistribution modified most electoral boundaries in the province and increased the number of MLAs from 79 to 85. The electoral boundaries created by the redistribution were first used in the 2009 provincial election.

The provincial government mandated the BC Electoral Boundaries Commission to recommend new maps (for both BC-STV and the traditional "single-member plurality" SMP systems) prior to the second electoral reform referendum. The commission's preliminary report, delivered in August 2007, was received with concern by both the New Democratic Party opposition and the governing Liberal party. In addition to concerns about boundaries and size of individual ridings, the commission was criticized for shifting seats to the Lower Mainland (which was growing in population) and away from larger but less-populated areas (BC has traditionally given some electoral weight to vast but relatively underpopulated regions without large urban centres, particularly in the north).

The commission held subsequent hearings and, in February 2008, submitted 50 amendments to its preliminary report. Province-wide, the amendments would result in a net increase of four electoral districts, for a total of 83 single member plurality electoral districts. The number of proposed BC-STV electoral districts remained at 20. Because of the concern of both parties about the loss of seats in the North and Cariboo, the Commission also reported on the 85-seat map it would have designed if the legislature had passed an amendment requiring this. The legislature then approved the alternative boundaries for 85 ridings.

The 2008 provincial election in neighbouring Alberta served as a reminder to BC of the "unfinished business" looming ahead. Ed Stelmach's Conservative party won a sizable majority government (73 out of 83 seats) on the strength of a bare majority of votes cast. In response, the Vancouver Sun described BC's indecision over boundaries as "a significant hitch (that) has developed in the electoral boundary reform process that was to have illustrated how an STV system would carve up the province...Unless members of the legislature are able to forge a compromise that will rescue the politically unpalatable recommendations of the Electoral Boundaries Commission, voters will face another vote on whether to change the system while still uncertain as to how it will look in their home communities."

Changes

No change (6)
Comox Valley
Delta North
Delta South
New Westminster
North Island
Saanich North and the Islands

Adjusted (44)
Burnaby North
Burnaby-Edmonds
Cariboo North
Columbia River-Revelstoke
Coquitlam-Maillardville
Fort Langley-Aldergrove
Kamloops-North Thompson
Kelowna-Lake Country
Kelowna-Mission
Langley
Maple Ridge-Mission
Maple Ridge-Pitt Meadows
Nanaimo
Nelson-Creston
North Coast
North Vancouver-Lonsdale
North Vancouver-Seymour
Oak Bay-Gordon Head
Peace River North
Peace River South
Powell River-Sunshine Coast
Richmond Centre
Richmond East
Richmond-Steveston
Saanich South
Shuswap
Skeena
Surrey-Cloverdale
Surrey-Green Timbers
Surrey-Newton
Surrey-Tynehead
Surrey-Whalley
Surrey-White Rock
Vancouver-Fairview
Vancouver-Fraserview
Vancouver-Hastings
Vancouver-Kensington
Vancouver-Kingsway
Vancouver-Langara
Vancouver-Mount Pleasant
Vancouver-Point Grey
Vancouver-Quilchena
Victoria-Beacon Hill
West Vancouver-Capilano

Minor adjustment with name change (3)
Kootenay East (was "East Kootenay")
Vernon-Monashee (was "Okanagan-Vernon")
West Vancouver-Sea to Sky (was "West Vancouver-Garibaldi")

Replaced (26)
(primary successor riding is shown)
Abbotsford-Clayburn → Abbotsford-Mission
Abbotsford-Mount Lehman → Abbotsford West
Alberni-Qualicum → Alberni-Pacific Rim
Bulkley Valley-Stikine → Stikine
Burnaby-Willingdon → Burnaby-Deer Lake
Burquitlam → Burnaby-Lougheed
Cariboo South → Cariboo-Chilcotin
Chilliwack-Kent → Chilliwack-Hope
Chilliwack-Sumas → Chilliwack
Cowichan-Ladysmith → Cowichan Valley
Esquimalt-Metchosin → Esquimalt-Royal Roads
Kamloops → Kamloops-South Thompson
Malahat-Juan de Fuca → Juan de Fuca
Nanaimo-Parksville → Parksville-Qualicum
Okanagan-Westside → Westside-Kelowna
Penticton-Okanagan Valley → Penticton
Port Coquitlam-Burke Mountain → Port Coquitlam
Port Moody-Westwood → Port Moody-Coquitlam
Prince George North → Prince George-Mackenzie
Prince George-Mount Robson → Prince George-Valemount
Prince George-Omineca → Nechako Lakes
Surrey-Panorama Ridge → Surrey-Panorama
Vancouver-Burrard → Vancouver-West End
Victoria-Hillside → Victoria-Swan Lake
West Kootenay-Boundary → Kootenay West
Yale-Lillooet → Fraser-Nicola

New ridings (6)
Abbotsford South
Boundary-Similkameen
Coquitlam-Burke Mountain
Nanaimo-North Cowichan
Surrey-Fleetwood
Vancouver-False Creek

See also
 New Brunswick electoral redistribution, 2006

References

Electoral redistributions in Canada
Electoral redistribution, 2008
British Columbia electoral redistribution, 2008
Electoral redistribution